Zale curema, the black-eyed zale or northeastern pine zale, is a moth of the family Noctuidae. The species was first described by John Bernhard Smith in 1908. It is found from New York to Maine, south to western North Carolina, west to the Gulf States and Texas. The species is listed as endangered in Connecticut.

The wingspan is about 35 mm. There is one generation per year.

The larvae feed on pitch pine. They prefer young needles.

References

External links

"Northeastern Pine Zale (Zale curema)". Forest Pests. Archived October 31, 2007. With larval stage info.

Catocalinae
Moths of North America
Moths described in 1908